Rumena Bužarovska is a fiction writer, literary translator, and social commentator born in 1981 in Skopje, SR Macedonia, SFR Yugoslavia. Her book My Husband (Dalkey Archive Press) has received critical acclaim in Europe and has been adapted into several stage productions. She is a professor at the State University in Skopje and co-runs the women’s storytelling initiative PeachPreach.

Bibliography

Rumena Bužarovska has authored the short story collections Scribbles (Чкртки, Ili-ili, 2007), Wisdom Tooth (Осмица, Blesok, 2010), My Husband (Мојот маж, Ili-ili, 2014) and I’m Not Going Anywhere (Не одам никаде, Ili-ili, 2018).

She has published a study on humor in short stories (За смешното: теориите на хуморот низ призмата на расказот, Blesok, 2012) and is part of the project Journal 2020, a non-fiction book written by six authors from former Yugoslavia born after 1980, documenting the year 2020 (Dnevnik 2020, Fraktura, 2021). In 2021 she published the children’s book illustrated by Jana Jakimovska What the Ladybug Saw (Што виде бубамарата?, Čudna šuma, 2021).

Bužarovska is the author of the screenplay for the short film Tina’s Problem, directed by Radovan Petrović and produced by Kino Oko in 2021.

She is the author of the radio play Nebenan for German radio WDR.

Rumena Bužarovska’s books have been published and translated into English, German, French, Italian, Spanish, Greek, Serbian, Bosnian, Croatian, Slovenian, Montenegrin, Albanian and Hungarian.

Her book My Husband has been staged in the national theaters in Skopje (Dramski Teatar, dir. Nela Vitosevic), Ljubljana (SNG Drama, dir. Ivana Đilas), and Belgrade (JDP, dir. Jovana Tomić) and has been dramatized in Budapest (produced and directed by Esztella Levko and Zsuzsanna Száger).

She is a columnist for the Serbian weekly Vreme and the Macedonian newspaper Nezavisen Vesnik and has published social commentary in a selection of magazines, journals and books.

Translations

Rumena Bužarovska is a literary translator from English into Macedonian. She has translated works by Flannery O'Connor, J. M. Coetzee, Lewis Carroll, Truman Capote, Iain Reid and Richard Gwyn. She is also the co-translator (together with Steve Bradbury) of her own short story collection into English I’m Not Going Anywhere (Dalkey Archive Press, 2023).

Awards

In 2016 she was named one of the New Voices from Europe by Literary Europe Live and received the regional award Edo Budiša in Croatia. She is a 2018 fellow of the International Writing Program in Iowa and a 2022 fellow of the Landys and Gyr Stiftung in Switzerland.

References

External links
 Philippe Petit, "Mon cher mari", de Rumena Buzarovska: scènes de la vie conjugale en Macédoine, Marienne, 12/09/2022 
 Elke Heidenreich – der Spitzentitel der Woche, Heidenreichs Spitzentitel, Der Zorn der Frauen, Der Spiegel, 21/03/2021 
 Alexander Wells, Rumena Buzarovska: “Patriarchy has its local variants”, Exberliner, 13/09/2021 
 Daniel Petrick, ‘I’m not nice anymore’: meet the author behind North Macedonia’s #MeToo movement, The Calvert Journal, 9/12/2020 
 Rumena Bužarovska, A Doctor in Three Wars, K2.0, 15/7/2022 
 Rumena Buzarovska et Brigitte Giraud: les livres à ne pas manquer, L'Express, 29/9/2022 

1981 births
Living people
Macedonian women writers
Macedonian translators
21st-century Macedonian writers
21st-century short story writers
People from Skopje